Agustín Sienra (born 14 July 1999) is an Argentine professional footballer who plays as a centre-back for Defensa y Justicia.

Career
Sienra started off his career with Defensores Santa Catalina, before later signing with Newell's Old Boys. In 2016, following a trial, Sienra joined the youth system of Defensa y Justicia. He made the move into first-team football towards the back end of 2020, appearing as an unused substitute for Copa Libertadores matches with Delfín (twice) and Olimpia and a Copa de la Liga Profesional encounter with Colón between September and November. It was in the latter month that the centre-back made his senior debut, as he featured for seventy-nine minutes of a domestic defeat to Central Córdoba on 29 November.

Career statistics
.

Notes

References

External links

1999 births
Living people
People from San Lorenzo Department
Argentine footballers
Association football defenders
Argentine Primera División players
Defensa y Justicia footballers
Sportspeople from Santa Fe Province